Dila, is the capital of Dila District in Paktika Province, Afghanistan. Dila has an altitude of 2044 m.

References

Populated places in Paktika Province